The 2020 Houston Outlaws season is the third season of the Houston Outlaws's existence in the Overwatch League (OWL). The Outlaws planned to host two homestand weekends at the Revention Music Center in Houston's downtown Theater District. While their first homestand took place, all other homestand matches were canceled due to the COVID-19 pandemic.

The Outlaws failed to make it past the quarterfinals in each of the three midseason tournaments of the season. Houston ended the season with a 6–15 record and were eliminated from postseason contention on September 3 after a 1–3 to the Boston Uprising in the North America play-ins tournament.

Preceding offseason

Sale of the franchise 
On June 12, 2019, Immortals Gaming Club (IGC), the parent company of Immortals and the Los Angeles Valiant, acquired Infinite Esports, the parent company of Houston Outlaws and OpTic Gaming, marking the first major sale of any Overwatch League franchise. By OWL rules, one company may not own more than one OWL franchise; while Riot Games and Activision Blizzard approved the sale, IGC operated Valiant and Outlaws as entirely separate entities, with oversight by OWL representatives, until they sold the Outlaws.

On November 14, 2019, Beasley Broadcast Group announced the acquisition of the Houston Outlaws from Immortals Gaming Club. The purchase marked the company's third esports venture.

Organizational changes 
In September 2019, the Outlaws released both head coach Kim "TaiRong" Tae-yeong and assistant coach Kim "Hyunwoo" Hyun-woo – both who had been in their positions since the team's inception in 2017 – after Houston's disappointing 2019 campaign. The following month, Houston signed Harsha Bandi, the former assistant coach of the Vancouver Titans and former analyst of the San Francisco Shock. Following, the team signed former Montreal Rebellion coach Chris "Dream" Myrick to their coaching staff.

Roster changes 

The Outlaws enter the new season with three free agents, one player which they have the option to retain for another year, and six players under contract. The OWL's deadline to exercise a team option is November 11, after which any players not retained will become a free agent. Free agency officially began on October 7.

Acquisitions 
The first signing for the 2020 season was on October 18, when the Outlaws signed DPS João Pedro "Hydration" Goes Telles, who had most recently played for the Los Angeles Gladiators. Three days later, the team acquired DPS Jeffrey "blasé" Tsang from the Boston Uprising. The following month, Houston picked up former Vancouver Titans flex support player Jung-geun "Rapel" Kim and former New York Excelsior flex tank Kim "MekO" Tae-hong. The team added former Seoul Dynasty support player Lee "Jecse" Seong-soo on January 2.

Departures 
On October 17, the Outlaws announced that they would not re-sign free agent DPS Jung "Arhan" Won-hyeop, who had been with the team since its inception in 2017. The following month, on November 9, the team announced that they would also not re-sign main support Chris "Bani" Bennell. On December 7, flex DPS Jake "Jake" Lyon announced that was retiring from professional Overwatch competition. A month later, on January 14, off-tank player Matt "Coolmatt" Iorio retired as a player and moved to an organizational role with the Outlaws.

Roster

Transactions 
Transactions of/for players on the roster during the 2020 regular season:
On July 15, the Outlaws released tank Alexandre "Spree" Vanhomwegen.
On August 1, support Shane "Rawkus" Flaherty retired.

Standings

Game log

Regular season

Midseason tournaments 

| style="text-align:center;" | Bonus wins awarded: 0

Postseason

References 

Houston Outlaws
Houston Outlaws
Houston Outlaws seasons